Nastra lherminier, the swarthy skipper, is a species of grass skipper in the butterfly family Hesperiidae. It is found in Central America and North America.

References

Further reading

External links

 

Hesperiinae
Articles created by Qbugbot
Butterflies described in 1824